Viljo (Wiljo) Einar Tuompo (23 September 1893, in Pornainen – 27 February 1957 in Helsinki) was a Finnish lieutenant general during World War II. He commanded the Finnish Border Guard from 1935 to 1939, and from 1940 to 1941. During the Winter War, he was commander of the North Finland Group. During the Continuation War, Tuompo was the Chief of the Command Staff at General Headquarters in Mikkeli. He retired in 1945.

External links
 General.dk

1893 births
1957 deaths
People from Pornainen
People from Uusimaa Province (Grand Duchy of Finland)
Finnish generals
German military personnel of World War I
People of the Finnish Civil War (White side)
Finnish military personnel of World War II